KRAB-A domain containing 2 is a protein that in humans is encoded by the KRBA2 gene.

References

Further reading